is a small video game development company headquartered in Musashino, Tokyo, Japan. It was founded on April 21, 1997, and has developed video games for other video game companies, including Nintendo, SEGA, and Square Enix.

Overview 
The name is a portmanteau, indicating independent video games with a low budget and minimal connections to other developers, which is described as "almost zero". Another candidate for the company name came from one of the fictitious game companies appearing in "Game Center CX Arino's Challenge".

The philosophy of the company is to make games that are easy to understand and user-friendly. The company initially specialized in games for handheld game consoles, but eventually expanded to smartphones. It makes licensed trading-card games for popular franchises such as Legend of Mana and Final Fantasy.

The founder Masanobu Suzui commented that the company plans to "make new products that has never been created before". He regards the company as a game developer that "cherishes a creative viewpoint rather than state-of-the-art technology capabilities" and makes games that can be immersed by a long-time video game player but also aimed at what everyone can easily play.

History 
In 1997, at age 24, Masunobu Suzui founded the company along with two members from the fresh graduate discovery project Nintendo & Dentsu Game Seminar (predecessor of the current Nintendo Game Seminar). They were initially tasked with developing for Nintendo's Satellaview peripheral for the Super Famicom. This includes Sutto Hankoku and Cooking Pong!.

The company developed many games for the Nintendo DS such as Electroplankton. Shaberu! DS Oryōri Navi released by Nintendo in July 2006 won the 10th Media Arts Festival Entertainment Division Excellence Award. Oshare Majo: Love and Berry was released from Sega in November, with one million copies sold and a special prize in the annual work section of the Japan Game Award 2007.

In June 2011, the company released DualPenSports as its first Nintendo 3DS game. It then collaborated with Square Enix on Theatrhythm Final Fantasy, in which Masunobu Suzui reunited with former Bandai producer Ikuro Kuroku. The game was ported to iOS and arcade, and had two independent sequels titled Theatrhythm Final Fantasy: Curtain Call and Theatrhythm Dragon Quest.

The company collaborated with Nintendo EAD for the development of NES Remix for both the Nintendo 3DS and the Wii U. During the planning phase, Koichi Hayashida, the Director of Nintendo Tokyo Production Department, who had participated in the Nintendo & Dentsu Game Seminar as a student together with Masunobu Suzui, called Suzui to partner on the game development. Suzui brought a prototype, which Hayashida immediately approved. Development of the Nintendo 3DS Guide Louvre Museum was recently completed, so the company was able to commit to the project. The game was well-reviewed and two sequels in the form of NES Remix 2 and Ultimate NES Remix were developed.

The company first mobile game is Grand Marche no Meikyuu, released in September 2016. The game was developed in collaboration with Square Enix, after development of Theatrhythm Dragon Quest. Square Enix announced the game server's closure in November 2017.

During Nintendo's E3 Presentation in 2017, the company was revealed to be co-developing Sushi Striker: The Way of Sushido, a strategic action-RPG-puzzle game for the Nintendo 3DS with Nintendo. It was ported as the company's first Nintendo Switch game, to be released on the same day as the 3DS version, and revealed in a Nintendo Direct in March 2018.

Gameography
* Released in Japan only

Super Famicom
 Sutte Hakkun (1997)* - Satellaview, later released on cartridge in 1999
 Oryouri Pon! (1997-1998)* - Four episodes, Satellaview exclusive

Windows
 Denshi no Seirei Chi-bitto (1998)*
 Kingdom Hearts: Melody of Memory (2021)

Game Boy Advance
 Sakura Momoko no Ukiuki Carnival (2002)*
 Mario Party-e
 Sennen Kazoku (2005)*

Nintendo DS
 Electroplankton (2005) - Rereleased in 2009 for DSiWare
 Oshare Majo: Love and Berry DS Collection (2006)*
 Shaberu! DS Oryōri Navi (2006)*
 Retro Game Challenge (2007)
 Cooking Guide: Can't Decide What to Eat? (2008) - known in North America as Personal Trainer: Cooking
 DS Calligraphy Training (2008)*
 GameCenter CX: Arino's Challenge 2 (2009)* - sequel to Retro Game Challenge

Nintendo 3DS
 DualPenSports (2011)
 Theatrhythm Final Fantasy (2012)
 Nintendo 3DS Guide: Louvre (2013)
 Theatrhythm Final Fantasy: Curtain Call (2014)
 Ultimate NES Remix (2014) - Additional work
 Real Escape Game X Nintendo 3DS (2015)*
 Theatrhythm Dragon Quest (2015)*
 Sushi Striker: The Way of Sushido (2018) - codeveloped with Nintendo EPD

Wii U
 NES Remix (2013) - Additional Work
 NES Remix 2 (2014) - Additional work

Nintendo Switch
 Sushi Striker: The Way of Sushido (2018) - co-developed with Nintendo EPD
 Dr Kawashima's Brain Training for Nintendo Switch (2019) - co-developed with Nintendo EPD
 Kingdom Hearts: Melody of Memory (2020)
 Big Brain Academy: Brain vs. Brain (2021) - co-developed with Nintendo EPD
 Theatrhythm Final Bar Line (2023)

PlayStation 4
 Kingdom Hearts: Melody of Memory (2020)
 Theatrhythm Final Bar Line (2023)

Xbox One
 Kingdom Hearts: Melody of Memory (2020)

Mobile
 Theatrhythm Final Fantasy (iOS) (2012)
 Grand Marche no Meikyuu (Android/iOS) (2016) - Shut down 11/30/2017

References

External links
 

Privately held companies of Japan
Software companies based in Tokyo
Video game companies of Japan
Video game development companies
Video game companies established in 1997
Japanese companies established in 1997
Musashino, Tokyo